Table tennis at the 1972 Summer Paralympics consisted of nineteen events, ten for men and nine for women.

Medal table

Medal summary

Men's events

Women's events

References 

 

1972 Summer Paralympics events
1972
Paralympics